Sonal Udeshi is an Indian actress, who worked in numerous television show. Her work includes C.I.D, Kuch Hawa Badli Si and Kaisi Yeh Zindgani, in which she played the lead role.

Television

References

Living people
Indian television actresses
Indian soap opera actresses
21st-century Indian actresses
Indian expatriates in Afghanistan
Place of birth missing (living people)
Year of birth missing (living people)